Jacqueline Vayntrub is an American scholar of Biblical studies and an associate professor of the Hebrew Bible at Yale Divinity School. Vayntrub earned her MA from Hebrew University of Jerusalem and her PhD from University of Chicago, and before her appointment at Yale, held a postdoctoral fellowship at Harvard University and an assistant professorship at Brandeis University. In 2019–2020, she was a fellow at the Katz Center for Advanced Judaic Studies at the University of Pennsylvania.

Among the major contributions of her research, according to Steven Weitzman, is "challenging how scholars think about biblical poetry... [and] also challenging them to think in new ways about philology as a scholarly approach to ancient texts," including through an innovative focus on recovering “a native understanding of biblical poetry.” Gregory Sterling writes, "she is widely recognized as one of her generation's leading authorities on poetry and wisdom literature."

Her 2019 book Beyond Orality: Biblical Poetry on its Own Terms has been heralded for "tremendous theoretical work Vayntrub is engaged in, which goes beyond every instance of a handful of terms to query, more broadly, how the Hebrew Bible holistically theorizes its own textuality." Mark Leuchter similarly notes how the book "has far-reaching significance for broader issues across the field of biblical studies and the study of ancient Israelite religion and intellectual history," and is "a masterclass in the metacriticism of the field of biblical studies." The book has been described as "a timely and incisive contribution to the study not just of biblical poetry, or of representations of oral speech in biblical literature, but of what many biblical traditions fundamentally are and reflect. It fits alongside an emerging set of efforts to rethink many of the key assumptions that shaped the study of biblical traditions throughout the twentieth century, and in many respects, still exert an outsized influence today."

Vayntrub founded the Philology in Hebrew Studies program unit at the Society of Biblical Literature, and she is a founding member of Renewed Philology. Other major positions include as a series editor of The Library of Hebrew Bible/Old Testament Studies and as a general editor of the experimental online journal Metatron.

In addition to publishing over 20 articles in scholarly journals and edited volumes, Vayntrub has written popular pieces such as "Sexy Sunday School: Naughty Bible Translation" for JSTOR Daily and "Who Is the Eshet Chayil?" for TheTorah.Com.

Bibliography
Beyond Orality: Biblical Poetry on its Own Terms (Routledge, 2019)
Philology and Gender. Hebrew Bible and Ancient Israel 8/4 (2019). Co-edited with Laura Quick and Ingrid Lilly.
“Biblical Hebrew šninɔ: a ‘Cautionary Tale’ of Root Identification.” Co-authored with H. H. Hardy II. Vetus Testamentum 64/2 (2014): 279-283.
“‘Observe due measure’: The Gezer Inscription and Dividing a Trip around the Sun,” 187-203 in Epigraphy, Philology, and the Hebrew Bible: Methodological Perspectives on the Comparative Study of the Hebrew Bible in Honor of Jo Ann Hackett, ed. Jeremy Hutton and Aaron Rubin. Ancient Near Eastern Monographs Series. Atlanta: Society of Biblical Literature, 2015.
“The Book of Proverbs and the Idea of Ancient Israelite Education.” Zeitschrift für die alttestamentliche Wissenschaft 128/1 (2016): 96–114. Honorable mention, Luckens International Prize in Jewish Thought and Culture, 2015.
“‘To take up a parable’: The History of Translating a Biblical Idiom.” Vetus Testamentum 66/4 (2016): 627-645.
“Before Authorship: Solomon in Prov. 1:1.” Biblical Interpretation 26 (2018): 182–206.
“Voice and Presence in the Genesis Apocryphon.” A Genius for Mentorship: A Forum in Honor of Ben Wright on his 65th Birthday. Ancient Jew Review, January 2018.
“Gender and Philology's Uncommon Sense.” Co-authored with Laura Quick and Ingrid Lilly. Hebrew Bible and Ancient Israel 8/4 (2019): 379–387.
“Like Father, Like Son: Theorizing Transmission in Biblical and Ancient Near Eastern Literature.” Hebrew Bible and Ancient Israel 7/4 (2018): 500–526.
“The Age of the Bible and Ancient Near East: Intellectual Developments and Highlights,” 30–38 in The Routledge Handbook of Jewish History and Historiography, ed. Dean Phillip Bell (London: Routledge, 2018).
“Mashal (Proverb),” 1258–1260 in Encyclopedia of Biblical Reception (EBR). Vol. 17: Lotus-Masrekah, ed. Christine Helmer et al. (Berlin: De Gruyter, 2019)
“Tamar and her Botanical Image.” Journal of Biblical Literature 139/2 (2020): 301–318.
“Tyre's Glory and Demise: Totalizing Description in Ezekiel 27.” Catholic Bible Quarterly 82/2 (2020): 214–236.
“Beauty, Wisdom, and Handiwork in Prov 31:10-31.” Harvard Theological Review 113/1 (2020): 45–62.
“Ecclesiastes and the Problem of Transmission in Biblical Literature,” in Writing and Scribalism: Authors, Audiences, and Texts in Social Perspective, ed. Mark Leuchter. T&T Clark 2020.
“Proverbs,” 11–29 in Wiley Blackwell Companion to Wisdom Literature, ed. Samuel Adams and Matthew Goff. Wiley-Blackwell, 2020.
“Wisdom in Transmission: Rethinking Proverbs and Sirach,” in Sirach and its Contexts: The Pursuit of Wisdom and Human Flourishing, ed. Gregory Goering, Matthew Goff, and Samuel Adams. Journal for the Study of Judaism Supplements (Leiden: Brill, 2021).
“Ancient Hebrew Literature,” in How Literatures Begin, ed. Denis Feeney and Joel Lande. Princeton: Princeton University Press, 2021.
“Advice: Wisdom, Skill, and Success,” in The Oxford Handbook of Wisdom and The Bible, ed. Will Kynes. Oxford: Oxford University Press, 2021.

References

External links 
 YDS Faculty: Jacqueline Vayntrub
 Humanities Commons: Prof. Jacqueline Vayntrub

Year of birth missing (living people)
Living people
Hebrew University of Jerusalem alumni
University of Chicago alumni
American biblical scholars
Yale Divinity School faculty
Brandeis University faculty
American women non-fiction writers